The Oncala Group is a geological formation in Spain. It dates back to the Berriasian.

Vertebrate fauna

Dinosaurs
Fossil tracks from euornithopods, sauropods, and theropods (including avialans) are known from the formation in Provincia de Soria, Spain. Indeterminate sauropod remains are known from the formation in Provincia de Soria, Spain.

Correlation

See also 
 List of dinosaur-bearing rock formations

References

Geologic groups of Europe
Geologic formations of Spain
Lower Cretaceous Series of Europe
Cretaceous Spain
Berriasian Stage
Paleontology in Spain